Deyalitza Aray is a Venezuelan politician, alternate deputy of the National Assembly for the Carabobo state.

Career 
Aray was elected as alternate deputy for the National Assembly for the Carabobo state for the 2016–2021 term in the 2015 parliamentary election, representing the Democratic Unity Roundtable (MUD). On 11 February 2020, she moved to Vargas state in a bus along with other deputies to receive Juan Guaidó after he went on an international tour. A checkpoint of the Bolivarian National Police prevented the passage of buses and detained her for more than four hours, releasing her in the evening.

She was subsequently appointed by Juan Guaidó as president of the Parliament Permanent Family Commission for the 2022-2023 period.

See also 
 III National Assembly of Venezuela
 IV National Assembly of Venezuela

References 

Venezuelan women in politics
Living people
Year of birth missing (living people)